Longopito is a settlement in Kenya's Eastern Province.

References

Populated places in Eastern Province (Kenya)